Badger High School is a public high school in Kinsman, Ohio, Trumbull County, Ohio. It is the only high school in the Joseph Badger Local School District. their mascot is the Braves, and they compete in the Ohio High School Athletic Association as a member of the Northeastern Athletic Conference.

The district is made up of four townships in the northeast Trumbull County (Gustavus, Kinsman, Vernon, and Hartford).

Athletics
Badger High School currently offers:
 Baseball
 Basketball
 Cheerleading
 Golf
 Softball
 Soccer
 Track and field
 Volleyball

Extracurriculars Activities 
Badger offers Art Club, Coronation Commitiee, E Sports Team, Drama Club, French and Spanish Clubs, Pep Club, Prep Bowl National Honors Society, Beta Club and Yearbook Committees

OHSAA State Championships

 Girls Softball – 1981, 1982
 Girls Cross Country - 2018
 Track and Field - 2012

Notable alumni
Christopher Barzak - award-winning novelist and short story author
Dave Blaney - professional NASCAR stock car racing driver
Dale Blaney - former college basketball player for the West Virginia Mountaineers & professional sprint car driver
Darren Fraley - NASCAR Crew chief

References

External links
 District Website

High schools in Trumbull County, Ohio
Public high schools in Ohio